Ambohimanga Sud (Ambohimanga Atsimo) is a town and commune in Madagascar. It belongs to the district of Ifanadiana, which is a part of the region Vatovavy. The population of the commune was 14,293 in 2018.

Primary and junior level secondary education are available in town. The majority 95% of the population of the commune are farmers.  The most important crops are rice and beans, while other important agricultural products are coffee and cassava. Services provide employment for 5% of the population.

References and notes 

Populated places in Vatovavy